Brinklow may refer to:

Places
 Brinklow, a village in Warwickshire, England
 Brinklow Castle, a castle in the north of the village of Brinklow, Warwickshire, England
 Brinklow, part of the civil parish of Kents Hill, Monkston and Brinklow in Milton Keynes, Buckinghamshire, England
 Brinklow, Maryland, a rural district in Montgomery County, Maryland, United States

People
Roberta Brinklow, fictional character in James Hilton's novel Lost Horizon
Henry Brinklow (d. 1545 or 1546), English polemicist who worked for a number of years under the pseudonym Roderyck, or Roderigo, Mors

See also
Binko (disambiguation)
Brink (disambiguation)
Rinko (disambiguation)